The Returned may refer to:

Films
The Returned (2004 film), a 2004 French zombie film
The Returned (2013 film), a 2013 Spanish-Canadian zombie film

Literature
The Returned (novel), a 2013 novel by American author Jason Mott

Television
Les Revenants (TV series), a 2012 French supernatural drama television series.
The Returned (U.S. TV series), a 2015 remake of the French TV series
"The Returned", an episode of the U.S. TV series Resurrection, based on Mott's novel